Tin Fu Tsai, sometimes transliterated as Tin Fu Chai, is a village in Tuen Mun District, Hong Kong.

Administration
Tin Fu Tsai is a recognized village under the New Territories Small House Policy. It is one of the 36 villages represented within the Tuen Mun Rural Committee.

History
Tin Fu Tsai was founded 300 years ago by the Choi clan. It had a population of several hundred villagers during its peak time and was considered a large and influential village in the Pat Heung area. The village is still inhabited by some indigenous villagers.

Interviews conducted in 1982 mentioned that "When Tsing Yi villagers wanted to marry, they looked for partners from Tin Fu Tsai, Tsuen Wan and Yuen Tun."

Features
The Tin Fu Tsai Campsite is located near the village. The campsite is located within Tai Lam Country Park.

Access
Tin Fu Tsai is located at the junction of Stage 9 and Stage 10 of the MacLehose Trail. It is also located along the Yuen Tsuen Ancient Trail.

See also
 Ho Pui Reservoir
 Tai Lam Chung Reservoir
 Tsing Fai Tong

References

External links
 Delineation of area of existing village Tin Fu Tsai (Tuen Mun) for election of resident representative (2019 to 2022)

Villages in Tuen Mun District, Hong Kong